Ana María Janer is a station on the Buenos Aires Premetro. It was opened on 29 April 1987 together with the other Premetro stations. The station is located in the Barrio of Villa Soldati in the vicinity of Sacachispas Fútbol Club.

The station was formerly called Fuerza Aérea, but was renamed in 2003 along with several other stations.

References

External links

Buenos Aires PreMetro stations
Buenos Aires Underground stations
Railway stations opened in 1987